Anodonthyla is a genus of microhylid frogs endemic to Madagascar. Molecular data suggest that it is the sister taxon to all other species in the subfamily Cophylinae.

Species
The genus contains twelve recognized species:

Description

One of the most obvious morphological synapomorphies of the genus is the presence, in males only, of a large prepollex that runs along the first finger and generally is closely connected to the first finger over most of its length. Correlated to this character, in males and females, the first finger is very short compared to other cophylines. This is true even of the extremely miniaturised species Anodonthyla eximia described in 2019.

Related pages
Amphibians of Madagascar

References

External links 

 
Cophylinae
Amphibian genera
Endemic frogs of Madagascar
Taxa named by Fritz Müller (doctor)